Jarod Devon "Snoop" Conner (born August 1, 2000) is an American football running back for the Jacksonville Jaguars of the National Football League (NFL). He played college football at Ole Miss.

Professional career

Conner was drafted by the Jacksonville Jaguars in the fifth round, 154th overall, of the 2022 NFL Draft. He scored his first NFL touchdown on a three-yard rush in Week 17 against the Houston Texans. He appeared in eight games as a rookie. He recorded 12 carries for 42 rushing yards and one rushing touchdown.

References

External links
Jacksonville Jaguars bio
 Ole Miss Rebels bio

Living people
American football running backs
Ole Miss Rebels football players
Jacksonville Jaguars players
2000 births